Barwadih is a town and Community Development Block in Latehar district of Jharkhand state in India.

Barwadih block 

Barwadih is a Block in Latehar District of Jharkhand State, India. Barwadih Block Headquarters is Barwadih town . It is located 47 km towards west from District headquarters Latehar. 157 km from State capital Ranchi towards East .

Barwadih Block is bounded by Chainpur Block towards North, Satbarwa Block towards East, Manika Block towards East, Daltonganj Block towards North . Daltonganj City, Garhwa City, Lohardaga City, Hussainabad City are the nearby Cities to Barwadih.	

Barwadih consist of 88 Villages and 16 Panchayats. It is in the  elevation (altitude) . This Place is in the border of the Latehar District and Palamu District. Palamu District Chainpur is North towards this place .

Betla National Park, Palamu, Latehar, Netarhat, Lohardaga are the nearby Important tourist destinations to see.

Railway stations 
Barwadih Junction railway station is one of the important railway junction in Latehar District.

Villages  

Barwadih,	Betla, Chhencha, Chhipadohar, Chungru,	Ganeshpur,	Haratu,
Ker,	Ketchki,	Khura,	Kuchila, Lat, Mangra, Morwai, Kala, Pokhrikala, Ukamanr,
Aghara, Akhara, Amdiha	 Amwatikar, Babhanddih	 Barawadih, Barkheta
Bonchattan, Bondohare, Bore	 Chamaradiha, Chapari, Chatam, Chunguru, Dorami, Gari	 Goshedag	 Guwa, Harinamar, Harne
Harpurwa, Hehegara	 Hendehas	 Horilong, Hosir, Hutar, Cohary, Jurgarh, Juruhar, Kachanpur, Kalayanpur, Kalpurwa, Karadih, Kechaki, Khami Khas, Kuku, Kushha, Bathan	 Kutamu, Labhar, Ladi, Lanka, Ledgani
Luhur, Lukum, Khar, Mandal	 Mangara	 Mantu, Meral, Morwai, Khurd
Mundu, Murgidih, Murmu, Nawadih	 Nawar, Nagu, Opag, Paira, Patradih, Pokhari, Kala, Pokhari, Khurd, Putwa, Garn, Rabdh, Ramandag, Saidup, Sarandih, Selari, Tanr, Serandag, Sindhorwa, Sukulkatha, Tanwai, Tatha, Togri, Ukumari, Grwathand, Addarsh Nagar

Demographics 

Hindi is the Local Language here. Also People Speaks Santali . Total population of Barwadih Block is 78,515 living in 14,590 Houses, Spread across total 88 villages and 16 panchayats. Males are 40,619 and Females are 37,896 
Total 7,218 persons lives in town and 71,297 lives in Rural.

Climate 
It is Hot in summer. Barwadih summer highest day temperature is in between 24 °C to 45 °C . 
Average temperatures of January is 16 °C, February is 20 °C, March is 25 °C, April is 30 °C, May is 35 °C .

Geography

It has an average elevation of 334 metres (1095 feet). Betla National Park is situated 8 km from Barwadih.

Demographics
 India census, Barwadih had a population of 7888. Males constitute 4160 of the population and females 3728. Barwadih has an average literacy rate of 5646; with 3226 of the males and 2420 of females literate. 1109 of the population is under 6 years of age.

Education

Schools
 St. Claret School, Barwadih
 Government. Boys High School, Barwadih
 Bal Shiksha Niketan, Barwadih
 Government. Boys High School, 
 Kasturba Gandhi Balika Vidyalaya, Barwadih
 Kanya Madhya Vidyalya, Barwadih
 Middle School, Barwadih
 Shanti Niketan Residential High School
 Railway School, Barwadih
 St. Soldier Public School, Barwadih
 Project Girl's High School, Barwadih
 St. Thomas School, Barwadih
 SARASWATI SHISHU VIDYA MANDIR
R.K MIDDLE SCHOOL HUTAR COLLIER
UPG +2 HIGH SCHOOL SARAIDIH, BARWADIH

Colleges
1- Rajkiya krit +2 High School
           Barwadih

2- RMR College Barwadih

Healthcare

Hospitals

 Railway Hospital Barwadih
 Gandhiji Health Care Home Barwadih
 Surya Hospital Barwadih
 State Government Hospital Barwadih

Temples, Church, Mosque

Temples

 Pahadi Shiv Mandir
 Lord Hanuman Mandir
 Panchmukhi Shiv Mandir
 Maa Kaali Mandir
 Shiv mandir

Church

 Church of North India
 Catholic Church

Mosque

 Mosque of Barwadih

Governmental offices
 Block of Barwadih
 Forest Department Barwadih
 Post-office Barwadih
 Police station barwadih

Bank

 State Bank of India Barwadih
 Gramin Bank

Railway department
 PWI Department
 IOW Department
 Signal Department
 ROH Shed
 Power House

Organisations
 Apna Adhikar Apna Samman Manch
 Akhil Bhartiya Vidyarthi Parishad

NGOs
 Jagriti Gram Utthan Sansthan
 Abhinav Vikas Seva Samiti 
 Pahal Jan Vikas

Tourist attractions
 Betla National Park
 Netarhat
 Pahadi Shiv Mandir
 Lord Hanuman Mandir

Barwadih Railway Station, Railway Sport Culb, High School Field, Garwathand Field, & Other

References

Latehar district
Community development blocks in Jharkhand
Community development blocks in Latehar district
Cities and towns in Latehar district